Marijan Kanjer (born 1 October 1973, in Rijeka) is a freestyle swimmer from Croatia, who competed in two consecutive Summer Olympics for his native country, starting in 1996.

References
 Short profile on Croatian Olympic Committee

1973 births
Living people
Croatian male freestyle swimmers
Olympic swimmers of Croatia
Swimmers at the 1996 Summer Olympics
Swimmers at the 2000 Summer Olympics
Sportspeople from Rijeka
Croatian male swimmers
Mediterranean Games bronze medalists for Croatia
Mediterranean Games medalists in swimming
Swimmers at the 2001 Mediterranean Games
21st-century Croatian people
20th-century Croatian people